Moscati is an Italian surname. Notable people with the surname include:

Giuseppe Moscati (1880-1927), Italian doctor and Catholic saint
Filippo Moscati (born 1992), Italian football player
Italo Moscati (born 1937), Italian writer, film director, and screenwriter
Marco Moscati (born 1992), Italian football player
Pietro Moscati (1739-1824), Italian doctor and politician 
Sabatino Moscati, (1922-1997), Italian archaeologist and linguist

 

Italian-language surnames